The 2004–05 Grenoble Foot 38 season was the club's 106th season in its existence and the fifth consecutive season in the Ligue 2. In addition to the domestic season, Grenoble Foot 38 participated in the Coupe de France and the Coupe de la Ligue.

Players

First-team squad

Pre-season and friendlies

Competitions

Overall record

Ligue 2

League table

Results summary

Results by round

Matches

Coupe de France

Coupe de la Ligue

Statistics

Goalscorers

References 

Grenoble Foot 38
Grenoble Foot 38 seasons